Kings & Queens is an album by punk band Sham 69, released in 1993 (see 1993 in music). It contains two new tracks; the remaining tiles are re-recordings of 70s material.

Track listing
All songs by Jimmy Pursey and Dave Parsons unless noted
 "Action Time Vision" - 2:43 (Alex Fergusson, Mark Perry)
 "I Don't Wanna" - 1:42
 "Ulster Boy" - 2:53
 "They Don't Understand" - 1:48
 "Tell Us the Truth" - 2:04
 "Borstal Breakout" - 2:00
 "Family Life" - 1:54
 "If the Kids Are United" - 3:37
 "Hurry Up Harry" - 3:03
 "Reggae Giro" - 4:35

References

1993 compilation albums
Sham 69 compilation albums